Gilles Larrain (born December 5, 1938) is a French-American photographer who believes photography is a way to "capture the landscape of the soul of a person". By taking a unique approach to photography, which includes creating his own lighting, managing the entire darkroom process, and always having subjects come to his personal studio space, Larrain has created acclaimed pieces of art since 1969. In 1973, Larrain published the highly successful photographic book, Idols, which presented portraits of transvestites. Two generations later, the book inspired American photographer Ryan McGinley who wrote an April 2010 article in Vice, which identified Larrain and the book Idols as one of his early and biggest influences for experimenting with colors, casting, and props, because all of Larrain's images in the book are raw without any manipulation. Larrain has photographed notable personalities in a wide range of creative disciplines, including the dancers of the American Ballet Theatre, Mikhail Baryshnikov, Salvador Dalí, Miles Davis, Sting, Billy Joel, Roberto Rossellini, Norman Mailer, and more.

Early life and education

Born in Dalat, Indochina (now Vietnam) on December 5, 1938, Gilles Larrain began an atypical life moving to Chile, Argentina, Canada, France, and the United States, all before the age of 16.

His father, Hernán Larrain, was a diplomat with the Chilean consul in Vietnam and a painter. His mother, Charlotte Mayer-Blanchy, was a French-Vietnamese pianist and painter. He is the great, great grandson of Paul Blanchy, the first mayor of Saigon (1895-1901) and the first pepper producer of Vietnam. He is the grandnephew of Rafael Larrain, the cardinal of Talca (Chile).

Larrain quickly learned multiple languages every two years and cultivated personal insights throughout his global experiences. His education took on a more traditional slant, beginning with the Lycee Francais de New York (1954-1957). He met his first wife, Anne-Marie Maluski, whose father brought Michelin tires to the US. The couple divorced a few years later and Anne-Marie became a published children's author under the name, Anne-Marie Chapouton.

Shortly after he received a French baccalaureate at Lycée Français, he spent brief periods of time at M.I.T. and New York University, and eventually at Ecole Nationale des Beaux-Arts in Paris where he studied architecture and worked in city planning (1960-1965). He also continued drawing and painting.

Throughout the 1960s, Larrain was a pioneer in kinetic art, using air, smoke, light, inflatable structures, water and neon tubes as means of artistic expression. In 1963, Larrain traveled to Oaxaca to study in Monte Alban and Mitla, where he realized drawing was insufficient to capture everything needed for information — photography became the essential medium to ask the right questions and get the right answers. Here, Larrain learned to use the camera to create pictures that magnified emotions. From this point, he decided to become an architect of the image.

Larrain's second marriage was to Marie Christine Bon in 1965 and they had a daughter, Olivia, in 1968. His third marriage was to Isabella Coco Cummings in 1989 and together they had a son, Lasco, in 1991. He is currently married to textile and couture designer, known by her first name, Louda, whom he married in 2006.

Work

Larrain's first one-man painting show was held in New York City at the Southampton East Gallery on 72nd Street in 1966. In addition to photography, Larrain began to add additional visual art forms. His paintings explored the space of shapes, colours, and materials; his kinetic art explored the space of light and volumes through neons and inflatable structure, which he showcased at the fifth Biennale de Paris "Espaces dynamiques en constant mouvement" and won the Les Levine prize with Francois Dallegret for their common work, Tubalair, at the sixth Biennale in 1969.

In 1968, The New York Post Daily Magazine featured an article about Larrain written by Nora Ephron. He also appeared at the Annual Avant Garde Festival of New York established by cellist and performance artist, Charlotte Moorman, and Korean American artist, Nam June Paik. Larrain began photographing full-time in 1969, which included commercial work for clients, such as Club Med, GTE, Lavazza, Knoll International, Joel Name Eyewear, American Ballet Theatre, Renault, as well as magazines, such as Esquire, Vogue, Oui, Rolling Stone, Time, New York and more.

In 1973, Larrain published the highly successful and controversial book, Idols, which presented portraits of New York's most talented, outrageous, glamorous transvestites, and mostly gay personalities, who posed in his legendary SoHo studio. Idols is an authentic compendium of 1970s Warhol-era New York style and attitude, featuring Holly Woodlawn, members of the San Francisco-based psychedelic drag queen performance troupe, the Cockettes, Taylor Meade, and John Noble.

Throughout the 1980s and later, Larrain's portraiture style was constantly sought after by wealthy clients including Miles Davis, Sting, Billy Joel, John Lennon, Yoko Ono, Jerry Rubin, Glenn Close, Norman Mailer, Mikhail Baryshnikov, publisher Maurice Girodias, Joe Cocker, wife of the late Shah of Iran, former Queen of Iran Farah Diba Pahlavi and Salvador Dalí. His skills were also used to create album covers for musicians. His subjects have ranged from dancers and musicians to artists and celebrities to friends and even a murderer, Michael Alig. Larrain insisted on mastering the entire photography process from taking shots on the camera all the way through the darkroom, so rather than meeting models in their own environment, subjects came to Larrain's studio to be photographed. Larrain aimed to capture the emotional background in addition to light, extracting what he wanted to extract. In 1982, Larrain worked with Robert Mapplethorpe, Deborah Turbeville, and Roy Volkmann on the book, Exquisite Creatures, which was published in 1985 by William Morrow & Company, Inc., focusing on the ineffable beauty of woman through a series of nude portraits.

In 1983, Larrain planned to visit Spain for a couple of weeks to photograph flamenco for GEO magazine. He ended up staying more than two months in the attic of La Carboneria, a flamenco venue in Seville, as a guest to the owner, Paco Lira, recognized as a godfather in the flamenco world. Captivated by the flamenco aesthetic, Larrain used his camera to capture the soul of flamenco in one of those rare artistic conjunctions where technical wisdom and experience become melded with the most difficult to express emotions. Larrain has also been playing flamenco guitar since 1960, often playing at various events, including the Art Salon Parties he would regularly host at the SoHo live-work space shared with his current wife, Louda. Their shared studio was 7 metres high with three intermediate floors, no windows showing anything of the outside world, and art displayed everywhere. These events were opportunities for new and established artists to meet and share creative collaborations. From 1996-2005, Larrain taught "The Intimate Portrait" course for International Center for Photography (ICP) at his studio.

Larrain now lives on Kauai, Hawaii with Louda. Together, they are developing a photography project, Dark Angel. He is in the process of publishing a book of his works, Stories by a Memory Maker, and continues to create. Much of his work is available for viewing on Behance.

Main exhibitions

 1966: "Sculptures", Group Exhibition of Artists, Max's Kansas City, New York
 1966: "Paintings by Gilles Larrain", Southampton East Gallery, Long Island, New York
 1967: "Light, Motion, Space", Sculptures, Group Exhibition of Artists, The Walker Art Center, Minneapolis, Minnesota
 1967: "Light, Motion, Space", Sculptures, Milwaukee Art Center, USA
 1967: "Luminism", Sculptures, The Artists' Club, New York
 1967: "Kinetic Environment", Sculptures, Central Park, New York
 1967: "5e Biennale de Sculpture", Sculptures, Musee d'Art Moderne, Paris, France
 1967: "Espace Dynamique en Constant Mouvement", Sculptures, Group Exhibition of Artists, Musee d'Art Moderne de la ville de Paris, Paris, France
 1968: "Light Rope, Modern Art", Sculptures, Group Exhibition of Artists, Neue Kunst U.S.A. Barock-Minima, Munich, Germany
 1969: "Inflated Children's Painting", Shakespeare Theatre, New York
 1969: "Induction Square", Lighted Sculpture, Group Exhibition of Artists, Suffolk Museum, Long Island, New York
 1969: "Induction Square", Lighted Sculpture, Group Exhibition of Artists, Visual Art Gallery, New York
 1969: "Ten Downtown", New York, USA
 1969: "Neon Sculptures", One-man Exhibition, Benson Gallery, Long Island, New York
 1969: "7th Annual Avant-Garde Festival", New York USA
 1969: Tubulaire", Conceptual Sculpture, Group Exhibition of Artists, Musee d'Art Moderne de la ville de Paris, Paris, France
 1970: "8th Annual Avant-Garde Festival", New York, USA
 1971: "Sigma", Art el Technologie Bordeaux
 1971: "Art et Technologies: Circus", Group Exhibition of Photography, Sigma, Bordeaux, France
 1972: "New-York Superstars: The Objective Eye", One-man Exhibition, Galerie Baecker, Bochum, Germany
 1973: "Exposition mondiale de photographie", Hamburg, Germany
 1975: "90 Black and White Prints", Palais des beaux-arts, Bruxelles, Belgium
 1975: "1+2+3 Weltausstellung der Photographie", STERN – Germany
 1975: "Faces and Spaces", Group Exhibition of Photography, Palais des Beaux-Arts, Brussels, Belgium
 1975: "Faces and Spaces", Two-man Exhibition, French Embassy, New York City
 1978: "Portraits", Group Exhibition of Photography, The Harkness House Gallery, New York City
 1978: "Portraits", Group Exhibition of Photography, The Neary Gallery Center, Santa Cruz, California
 1980: "I Sing the Body Electric", Group Exhibition of Photography, The Squibb Gallery, Princeton, New Jersey
 1981: "Inter Faces", One-man Exhibition, Aspen Institute for Humanistic Studies, Aspen, Colorado
 1982: "Of 48 Black & White Prints", One-man Exhibition, Wye Plantation of the Aspen Institute, Queenstown, Maryland
 1982: "Recent Photos", One-man Exhibition, Gallerie Agathe Gaillard, Paris, France
 1983: "An Exhibition of Portraits", One-man Exhibition, French Institute, New York City
 1984: "Coast to Coast: Recent Works of Photographers", Group Exhibition of Photography, Houston Center for Photography, Houston, Texas
 1984: "Des Enfants", One-man Group Exhibition, Galerie Agathe Gaillard, Paris, France
 1984: "American Ballet Theater", One-man Group Exhibition, Dyansen 57 Gallery, New York
 1984: "American Ballet Theater: 44th Year Retrospective", Group Exhibition of Photography, Dyansen 57 Gallery, New York
 1985: "Art Mode Werbung", Group Exhibition of Photography, Gallerie Tabula, Tübingen, Germany
 1985: "10th Anniversary", Group Exhibition of Photography, Gallerie Agathe Gaillard, Paris, France
 1987-1992: "Faces and Spaces", One-man Exhibition, Services Culturels de l'ambassade de France, New York
 1990-1991: "Mirros of Memory: Photos Icons", One-man Exhibition, The Meadows Museum, Dallas, Texas
 1991: "Photographes de la Galerie", One-man exhibition, Centre de la photographie, Genève, Switzerland
 1992: "Personal Exhibition", One-man Exhibition, Centre de la photographie, Genève, Switzerland
 1993: "Multiple Choices Here and Now", One-man Exhibition, The French Embassy, New York
 1993: "A Retrospective: The Photographs of Gilles Larrain 1972-1993", The Union League Club, New York
  1994: "84-94 Centre de la photographie Genève", Galleria Gottardo, Lugano Switzerland + Grand Passage, Genève, Switzerland
 1995: "32 Photographic Diptychs", One-man Exhibition, Henry Buhl Foundation, New York
 1996: "Nudeyork", Exhibition and book by 31 photographers, Mary Anthony Galleries, New York
 1996: "Jazz Portraits", Group Exhibition, Center of Photography, Woodstock, New York
 1997: "Photographie D'Une Collection", Group Exhibition, La Caisse des Depots et Consignations, Paris, France
 2000: "Le nu photographie", Group Exhibition of Photography, Galerie d'Art du Conseil General des Bouches-du Rhone, Aix-en-Provence, France
 2000: "Le nu photographie", Group Exhibition of Photography, Caixa de Sabadell, Espana
 2000: "Le nu photographie", Group Exhibition of Photography, Ecole le Bon secours, Genève, Switzerland
 2001: "Flamenco: Landscape of Its Soul", One-man Exhibition, King Juan Carlos I of Spain Center, New York University, New York
 2003: "Dance, Collection M+M Auer", Group Exhibition of Photography, Foundation Fluxum Laboratory, Carouge GE, Switzerland
 2004: "Collection d'oeuvres photographiques de la Caisse des Depot et Consignations", Group Exhibition, Centre Culturgest, Lisbonne, Portugal
 2004: "Collection M+M Auer Une Histoite de la Photographie", Group Exhibition, Musée d'art et d'histoire, Genève, Switzerland
 2006: "Flamenco: Paisaje del Alma", One-man Exhibition, Fundacion Tres Culturas, Seville, Spain
 2006: "Flamenco: Paisaje del Alma", One-man Exhibition, Casa Escorza, Guadalajara, Mexico
 2006-2007: "M+M Friends", Group Exhibition, Fondation nationale des arts graphiques et plastiques, Maison d'art Bernard Anthonioz, Nogent-sur-Marne, France + España 
 2007: "M+M COL.LECCIO Passion per la Fotografia", Group Exhibition, Nuseu d'Art Modern i Contemporani, Fundacio Es Baluard, Palma Mallorca, España
 2007: "Regarde! Des Enfants Collection Collection M+M Auer", Group Exhibition, Photographie Pavillon Populaire, Montpellier, France
 2007: "Flamenco: Paisaje del Alma", One-man Exhibition, Instituto Nacional Bellas Artes, Tetuan, Morocco
 2007: "Flamenco: Paisaje del Alma", One-man Exhibition, Musee Municipal, Agadir, Morocco
 2007: "Flamenco: Paisaje del Alma", One-man Exhibition, Palace Abdellya, Tunis, Tunisia
 2007: "Flamenco: Paisaje del Alma", One-man Exhibition, Auditorium di Roma, Rome, Italy
 2007: "Flamenco: Paisaje del Alma", One-man Exhibition, Instituto Cervantes, Prague, Czech republic
 2008: "Flamenco: Paisaje del Alma", One-man Exhibition, Centro Cultural Español, Miami, Florida
 2009: "Prohibido El Cante, Flamenco y Fotografia", Group Exhibition, Centro Andaluz de Arte Contemporáneo, Sevilla, Spain
 2009: "Art Salon Party", One-man Exhibition, New York, USA
 2010: "Art Salon Party", One-man Exhibition, New York, USA
 2010: "NO SINGING ALLOWED, FLAMENCO & FOTOGRAFIA", Group Exhibition, Aperture Gallery, New York
 2010: "Photographie Americaine: Regards sur la Collection M+M Auer", Group Exhibition, Galerie Francoise Besson, Lyon France
 2011: "Idols", One-man Exhibition, Steven Kasher Gallery, New York
 2011: "wHat", Group Exhibition, Galerie 103, Po'ipu, Kaua'i
 2012: "Vidas Gitanas, Lungo Drom", Group Exhibition, Centro Cultural CajaGranada, Granada, Espana
 2012: Retrato Flamenco. Cristobal Hara y Gilles Larrain
 2013: "Dark Angels with Louda"

Bibliography

Books by Gilles Larrain
 Idols – 2011, 
 Idols – 1973

Books featuring Gilles Larrain
 Exquisite Creatures, Deborah Turbeville Y Roy Volkmann, Donald Barthelme, Robert Maplethorpe
 American Ballet Theatre
 Miles Ahead
 Mapplethorpe Biography
 Milestones1
 Milestones2
 Miles Japan Edition
 Miles Japan Edition 2
 Miles English Edition
 Kunst Graphics
 Daily Life
 Human Body | Human Spirit
 Harmonia Mundi 2005
 Flamenco: Paisaje del Alma

Selected press
 The New York Daily Post, by Nora Ephron
 Vice (Ryan McGinley)
 Rebe Rebel
 New York Times (1970s take and social disrobing)
 Photographers Encyclopedia — collections
 Tablao Mag
 S Magazine JPT
 View Camera — Rosalind

References

American photographers
1938 births
Living people